Camden Council is a local government area in the Macarthur region of Sydney, in the state of New South Wales, Australia. The Mayor of Camden is Cr. Therese Fedeli, a member of the Liberal Party.

Suburbs in the local government area 
Suburbs serviced by Camden Council are:

Demographics
At the  there were  people in the Camden local government area, of these 49.1 per cent were male and 50.9 per cents were female. Aboriginal and Torres Strait Islander people made up 3.2 per cent of the population; similar to the NSW and Australian averages of 3.4 and 3.2 per cent respectively. The median age of people in the Camden Council area was 33 years, which is significantly lower than the national median of 38 years. Children aged 0 – 14 years made up 25.3 per cent of the population and people aged 65 years and over made up 9.9 per cent of the population. Of people in the area aged 15 years and over, 54.0 per cent were married and 10.9 per cent were either divorced or separated.

At the 2016 census, the population in the Camden local government area increased by 37.9 per cent. When compared with total population growth of Australia for the same period, being 8.8 per cent, population growth in Camden local government area was in excess of four times the national average. The median weekly income for residents within the Camden Council area was generally slightly higher than the national average.

In excess of 58.0% of residents in the Camden Council area nominated a religious affiliation with Christianity at the 2021 census, compared with the national average of 43.9%; and the proportion of residents with no religion was about half the national average. Meanwhile, as at the 2021 census date, compared to the national average, households in the Camden local government area had a slighter higher proportion (22.5 per cent) where two or more languages are spoken (national average was 22.3 per cent); and had a similar proportion (74.0 per cent) where English only was spoken at home (national average was 72.0 per cent).

Council

Current composition and election method
Camden Council is composed of nine Councillors elected proportionally as three separate wards, each electing three Councillors. All Councillors are elected for a fixed four-year term of office. The Mayor is elected by the Councillors at the first meeting of the Council. The most recent election was held on 4 December 2021, and the makeup of the Council is as follows:

The current Council, elected in 2021, in order of election by ward, is:

Mayors from 1896 to Present

Development
In Camden Council area there were 2,168 residential buildings approved to be built in the financial year 2021-22.
Being a significant part of the South-Western Sydney Growth Area, Camden Council represents a rapidly growing region which is expected to house a large portion of Sydney's population growth over the coming decade. To the north are residential developments including Oran Park (8,000 homes) and Gregory Hills (2,600 homes), whilst to the south are further developments of the Elderslie estate.

A Muslim group, the Quranic Society, made a development application in the Camden area for an 19 million Muslim school with the capacity for 1,200 students. In May 2008 the Council voted unanimously to reject the application. After reducing its proposal to a school catering for 900 students, the Quranic Society took its case to the Land and Environment Court. The application was met with significant community protest; and the application rejected by the Court on the grounds that the land chosen was suited to rural uses.

Heritage listings
The Camden Council has a number of heritage sites, including:
 Camden, 135 Argyle Street: Camden Post Office
 Camden, Aerodrome Road,  Cobbitty: Macquarie Grove
 Camden, Exeter Street: Nant Gwylan and Garden
 Camden South, Elizabeth Macarthur Avenue: Camden Park Estate and Belgenny Farm
 Catherine Field, 1025 Camden Valley Way: Raby, Catherine Field
 Cobbitty, 421 The Northern Road: Denbigh, Cobbitty
 Gledswood Hills, 900 Camden Valley Way: Gledswood
 Harrington Park, 1 Hickson Circuit: Harrington Park (homestead)
 Harrington Park, 181 - 183 Northern Road: Orielton
 Narellan, Camden Valley Way: Studley Park, Narellan
 Narellan, Kirkham Lane: Camelot, Kirkham
 Narellan, Kirkham Lane: Kirkham Stables
 Oran Park, 112-130 Oran Park Drive: Oran Park (homestead)

See also

 Local government areas of New South Wales

References

External links 

 Camden Council website

 
Local government areas in Sydney
Macarthur (New South Wales)